Sean McCormack (born 1964) is a former United States Assistant Secretary of State. He was sworn in as Assistant Secretary of State for Public Affairs and Department Spokesman on June 2, 2005, and served until January 20, 2009. McCormack is currently vice president of Communications for Boeing Commercial Airplanes.

Education 
McCormack graduated from Colby College in 1986 with a bachelor's degree in economics. He received an M.A. in international relations from the University of Maryland, College Park in 1990.

Career 
Prior to joining the Foreign Service, McCormack was an analyst at the Meridian Corporation working on issues related to arms control and non-proliferation.

Department of State 
McCormack began his career in the Foreign Service in 1995. He served at the U.S. embassy in Ankara from 1996 to 1998, where he was assigned as the Persian-speaking officer in the consular section. He was posted to the U.S. embassy in Algiers from 1998 to 1999, with responsibility for economic reporting and consular issues.

McCormack was posted to the State Department Operations Center in 1999 before moving to the Executive Secretariat Staff ("The Line"). He was detailed to the National Security Council Staff in 2001.

Immediately prior to returning to the State Department, McCormack was Special Assistant to the President, Spokesman for the National Security Council, and Deputy White House Press Secretary for Foreign Policy.

Executive 
McCormack joined Boeing in 2009 and served as the vice president of Communications in Government Operations in the Washington DC office of Boeing until 2014.

References

External links
Probe of USS Cole Bombing Unravels Washington Post May 4, 2008
His Department of State Biography
Sean McCormack's Twitter Stream

1964 births
Living people
Place of birth missing (living people)
Colby College alumni
University of Maryland, College Park alumni
United States Department of State spokespeople
United States Assistant Secretaries of State